Sussex 4 is an English level 12 rugby union league traditionally divided into two regional divisions. It is run by the Sussex Rugby Football Union and features teams from this county. Teams play home and away matches from September to April.  Promoted teams move up to Sussex Oranjeboom Division 3 and there is no relegation.  The division has changed format several times in its history, originally being a regional division before changing to a single division and then back to a regional for the 2016-17 season.

Sussex 4 honours

Sussex 3 East / West

What is now known as Sussex 4 was introduced as Sussex 3 despite being at the 4th level of Sussex rugby.  It was split into two regional divisions - Sussex "Bishop's Finger" 3 East and Sussex "Late Red" 3 West.  Both divisions were ranked at tier 12 of the English league system, with promotion to either Sussex 2 East and Sussex "Oranjeboom" 2 West and, as it was the lowest regional division, there was no relegation.

Sussex 3

The division would re-merge as a single division known as Sussex "Late Red" 3.  Promotion continued to either Sussex "Asahi" 2 East or Sussex "Oranjeboom" 2 West, and there was no relegation.

Sussex 4 West

The division would be renamed Sussex "Late Red" 4 West and would sit at tier 12 of the league system.  Promotion was to Sussex 3 and there was no relegation.

Number of league titles

Burgess II (1)
Haywards Heath II (1)
Holbrook (1)
Horsham II (1)
Horsham III (1)
Hove IV (1) 
Newick II (1)
Seaford II (1)
Uckfield III (1)
Worthing Senior I
Worthing Senior II

Notes

See also
Sussex RFU
English rugby union system
Rugby union in England

References

External links
Sussex Rugby

Rugby union leagues in England
Rugby union in Sussex